The 2012 Walt Disney World Pro Soccer Classic was a preseason soccer tournament held at Walt Disney World's ESPN Wide World of Sports Complex. The tournament, the third edition of the Pro Soccer Classic, was held from February 24 to March 3 and featured six Major League Soccer clubs along with one USL Pro club and one Swedish Allsvenskan club.

The tournament was won by the Vancouver Whitecaps FC, who defeated Toronto FC 1–0 in the final.

Teams
The following eight clubs competed in the tournament:

 Orlando City from the USL Professional Division, hosts (2nd appearance) 
 Toronto FC from Major League Soccer (3rd appearance)
 FC Dallas from Major League Soccer (3rd appearance)
 Houston Dynamo from Major League Soccer (3rd appearance)
 Sporting Kansas City from Major League Soccer (1st appearance)
 Montreal Impact from Major League Soccer (1st appearance)
 Vancouver Whitecaps FC from Major League Soccer (1st appearance)
 BK Häcken from Allsvenskan (1st appearance)

Matches

Group stage
Tie-breaking criteria
If two or more teams were equal on points on completion of the group matches, the following criteria would be applied to determine the rankings:
winner of head-to-head match;
superior goal difference from all group matches played;
higher number of goals scored from all group matches played;
lowest number of goals allowed from all group matches played;
single point deduction per red card or send off;
coin toss with the club whose home city is list first alphabetically calling the toss;

Pool 1

Pool 2

Championship Round

Consolation match

Final

External links
 Official Site 
 WDW Pro Soccer Classic release and schedule 

2012 in American soccer
2012